Frederick Opare-Ansah (born September 5, 1968) is an Electrical Engineer and Ghanaian politician who is a member of the Fourth and Seventh Parliament of the Fourth Republic of Ghana representing the Suhum Constituency in the Eastern Region on the ticket of the New Patriotic Party (NPP).

Early life and education 
Opare-Ansah was born on September 5, 1958. He hails from Amankokrom-Akuapem, a town in the Eastern Region of Ghana. He graduated from Kwame Nkrumah University of Science and Technology and obtained his Bachelor of Science degree in electrical engineering in 1994.

Employment 
Opare-Ansah worked as the managing director of Third Rail (Ghana) Limited. He is an Engineer by profession.

Political career 
Opare-Ansah is a member of the New Patriotic Party (NPP). He is a member of the 4th, 5th, 6th and 7th Parliament of the 4th Republic of Ghana. He first became a member of the Parliament of Ghana representing Suhum Constituency in January 2005 after emerging winner of his constituency polls in the 2004 General Elections in December. He is having a run of 4 consecutive terms in office now as he still represents his constituency in the current 7th Parliament of Ghana. He is the Chairperson of Communications committee and a committee member of committees on Finance and Business. In the 5th parliament of the 4th parliament of Ghana he was the Minority Chief Whip.

Elections 
Opare-Ansah represented the Suhum constituency as the Member of Parliament for the 5th parliament of the 4th republic of Ghana. He was elected on the ticket of the New Patriotic Party by obtaining 17,461 votes out of the 38,577 total valid votes cast, equivalent to 45.3% of total valid votes cast. He was elected over Jacob Kwaku Arkoh of the People's National Convention, Samuel Fleischer Kwabi of the National Democratic Congress, Francis Darby Kobena Inkoom of the Convention People's Party, Matilda Garbrah an independent candidate. These obtained 0.75%, 41.02%, 0.77% and 12.20% respectively of total valid votes cast.

Personal life 
Opare-Ansah is a Christian. He is married.

References

Ghanaian MPs 2017–2021
1968 births
Living people
New Patriotic Party politicians
Kwame Nkrumah University of Science and Technology alumni
Ghanaian MPs 2009–2013
Ghanaian Christians
Ghanaian engineers
People from Eastern Region (Ghana)
Ghanaian MPs 2005–2009